Dasypyga salmocolor is a species of snout moth in the genus Dasypyga. It was described by André Blanchard in 1970 and is known from the south-western United States, including Texas and California.

References

Moths described in 1970
Phycitinae